Isaabad (also Romanized as ‘Īsáābād; also known as ‘Īsāābād-e Sar Bonān, and Īsīābād) is a village in Sarbanan Rural District, in the Central District of Zarand County, Kerman Province, Iran. At the 2006 census, its population was 609, in 145 families.

References 

Populated places in Zarand County